One Night in Washington is a live album by trumpeter Dizzy Gillespie and The Orchestra recorded in 1955 and  released on the Elektra/Musician label in 1983.

Reception
The Allmusic review stated "Gillespie obviously steals the show" and awarded the album 4 stars.

Track listing
 "The Afro Suite: Manteca/Contrasta/Jungla/Rhumba Finale" (Dizzy Gillespie, Chano Pozo, Gil Fuller/Gillespie, Chico O'Farrill/Gillespie, O'Farrill/Gillespie, O'Farrill) - 16:47 
 "Hob Nail Boogie" (Buster Harding, Count Basie) - 7:56 
 "Wild Bill's Boogie" (Harding, Basie) - 6:25 
 "Caravan" (Juan Tizol) - 5:15 
 "Tin Tin Deo" (Gillespie, Pozo) - 6:26 
 "Up 'N' Downs" (Tom McKay) - 6:14

Personnel
Dizzy Gillespie - trumpet, vocals
Al Porcino, Bob Carey, Bunny Aldhizer, Chas Frankhauser, Ed Leddy, Marky Markowitz - trumpet 
Earl Swope, Dick Leith, Rob Swope - trombone
Mike Goldberg - alto saxophone
Angelo Tompros, Jim Parker, Spencer Sinatra - tenor saxophone
Joel Davie - baritone saxophone
Larry Eanet - piano 
Ed Dimond - piano, percussion
Mert Oliver, Tom McKay - bass 
Joe Timer - drums, musical director 
Bovino, George Caldwell - congas 
Buddy Rowell - timbales

References 

Dizzy Gillespie live albums
1983 live albums
Elektra/Musician live albums